This is a table containing the figures from the WHO Influenza A Situation Updates issued in June 2009 roughly three times a week.  The table can by sorted by country, date of first confirmed case or date of first confirmed case by continent.

This presentation of the data in this and other tables shows the progression, peaks, and, eventually, decline of the epidemic in each country and continent.

Summary tables | Previous month | Next month

Confirmed cases

Deaths

References

June 2009